Pieces of Winter Sky is a composition for chamber ensemble by the American composer Aaron Jay Kernis.  The work was commissioned by the consortium Music Accord for the ensemble eighth blackbird.  The piece was a runner-up for 2013 Pulitzer Prize for Music, losing to Caroline Shaw's Partita for 8 Voices.

Composition
Pieces of Winter Sky has a duration of roughly 22 minutes and is composed in a single movement.  Kernis described the composition in the score program notes, remarking:

Instrumentation
The work is scored for a small ensemble comprising flute, clarinet, percussion, piano, violin, and cello.

References

Compositions by Aaron Jay Kernis
2012 compositions
Chamber music compositions